Korytno  is a village in the administrative district of Gmina Masłowice, within Radomsko County, Łódź Voivodeship, in central Poland.

The village has a population of 400.

References

Korytno